Johannes Hinderbach (15 August 1418 – 21 September 1486) was Prince-Bishop of Trent from 12 May 1466 until his death. He was by birth a member of the Austrian nobility. Prior to his appointment as Bishop, he served as an advisor to the court of Fredrick III.

He was notable for his involvement in the case of Simon of Trent, a young boy who was found murdered in 1475; Hinderbach blamed the local Jews for his death (see blood libel), executed several of them, and promoted Simon's canonisation as a saint.

The only remnant of Hinderbach's tomb is a still existing memorial slab, exhibited at the Museo Diocesano Tridentino.

References 

1418 births
1486 deaths
Prince-Bishops of Trent
15th-century Italian Roman Catholic bishops